Nijrell Keon Eason (born May 10, 1979) is a former American football cornerback who played one season for the Arizona Cardinals in 2002. He also played for the Frankfurt Galaxy.

Early life
Nijrell Eason was born on May 20, 1979, in Long Beach, California. He went to high school at Woodrow Wilson Classical (CA).

College
Nijrell went to college at Arizona St. In 1999 he played 12 games and had one interception. In 2000 he had 5 interceptions and was tied for 1st in Pac 12 for interceptions. He was also a finalist for the Jim Thorpe Award.

Professional career

Nijrell Eason went undrafted in 2001. He was signed by the Cardinals but released during roster cuts. He was signed by the Pittsburgh Steelers in 2002 but was also released in roster cuts. He later played for the Frankfurt Galaxy in 2002. Later in the season, he was signed again by the Cardinals, and played in one game.

References

1979 births
Arizona Cardinals players
Players of American football from Long Beach, California
American football defensive backs
Arizona State Sun Devils football players
Frankfurt Galaxy players
Living people